The Epigraphical Museum of Athens, Greece, is unique in Greece and the largest of its kind in the world. Its collection comprises 14,078, mostly Greek, inscriptions, which cover the period from early historical times to the Late Roman period, primarily in Greece. It is situated in the south wing of the National Archaeological Museum of Athens. It comprises an internal and external courtyard (atrium), a lobby, eleven rooms, a large hypostyle Pi-shaped corridor, a gallery, offices, a laboratory for the conservation of inscribed stone monuments and lavatories. Only the courtyards, lobby and four rooms are open to the public, while the rest is reserved for researchers. A full photographic archive of the collection is being assembled for future visitors.

Gallery

External links

Ministry of Culture and Tourism

Archaeological museums in Athens
Museums of ancient Greece in Greece
Museums established in 1885
1885 establishments in Greece
Epigraphic museums